Shahralanyozan was an Iranian officer who served as the military governor of Sasanian Egypt during the 620s.

Name
The Middle Persian word Shahrālānyōzān is actually an honorific title which, according to Saeid Jalalipour, means "the one who combats the Alans". According to Ilya Gershevitch, the title means "most powerful of commanders".

The name is recorded in Greek sources as Saralaneozan and Sahralanyozan.

Biography 
Sahralanyozan is first mentioned in 621 as being appointed the military governor of Egypt after the conquest of the province by the Sasanian general Shahrbaraz. Sahralanyozan held the title of karframan-idar ("steward of the court") and was the most powerful Iranian in Egypt. Besides being governor of Egypt, he was also the tax-collector of the province, and most likely resided in Faiyum. Although Egypt suffered much damage during its invasion by the Sasanians, after the conquest was complete, peace, toleration and rehabilitation followed. Furthermore, the Sasanians retained the same administrative structure as the Byzantine Empire.

In 626, Shahrbaraz quarrelled with the Sasanian king Khosrow II (r. 590-628) and mutinied against him. It is not known whom Sahralanzoyan supported, since he is not mentioned in any source thereafter and Shahrbaraz is described as the ruler of the province. Following the end of the Byzantine–Sasanian war in 628, by 630/1, Egypt had returned to Byzantine hands.

References

Sources 
 
 
 

Generals of Khosrow II
People of the Byzantine–Sasanian War of 602–628
Year of birth unknown
Year of death unknown

7th-century deaths
7th-century Iranian people
7th-century Egyptian people
Governors of Egypt
Governors of the Sasanian Empire
Sasanian Egypt